The Great War is the second solo album by singer/songwriter Justin Currie, best known for his involvement in the band Del Amitri.

Track listing
All songs written by Justin Currie.
"A Man with Nothing To Do" – 3:34
"Anywhere I'm Away from You" – 4:09
"At Home Inside of Me" – 2:32
"You'll Always Walk Alone" – 2:55
"Can't Let Go of Her Now" – 3:46
"The Fight to be Human" – 8:17
"Ready to Be" – 4:02
"The Way That It Falls" – 2:44
"As Long As You Don't Come Back" – 2:45
"Everyone I Love" – 4:07
"Baby, You Survived" – 4:05
"In My Heart, The War Goes On (Bonus Track)" – 3:09
"The Darkness of the Day (Bonus Track)" – 2:28
"What You're Looking At (Bonus Track)" – 3:48

Personnel
Justin Currie – vocals, acoustic guitar, bass, piano, organ
Jim McDermott – drums, percussion
Nick Clark – bass, backing vocals
Mick Slaven – electric guitar, banjo
Stuart Nisbet – acoustic and electric guitar, pedal steel
Peter Adams – piano, electric piano, organ, optigan
Andy May – organ, piano, backing vocals
Andrew Berridge – viola
Cheryl Crockett – violin
Donald Gillan – cello
Liza Johnson – violin
Robin Panter – viola
Alastair Savage – violin

References 

2010 albums
Justin Currie albums
Rykodisc albums